Acid King is an American stoner metal band from San Francisco, California. It was formed in 1993 by frontwoman Lori S., drummer Joey Osbourne and bassist Peter Lucas. Acid King have since recorded four studio albums and two EPs with a series of bassists.

The band's name was inspired by the crimes of Ricky Kasso, who murdered his friend Gary Lauwers in Northport, New York on June 19, 1984. Kasso was nicknamed "Acid King" by his peers due to his chronic hallucinogenic drug use. The band's self-titled debut EP features a photograph of Kasso on its cover. The band itself has also been featured in two books – The Encyclopedia of Heavy Metal and the A to Z of Doom, Gothic & Stoner Metal – both published in 2003.

Members

Current members 
Lori S. – guitar, vocals, lyrics (1993–present)
Rafa Martinez– bass (2005–2008, 2017–present)
Bil Bowman – drums (2017–present)

Previous members 
Peter Lucas – bass (1993–1996; appears on Acid King and Zoroaster)
Dan Southwick – bass (1996–1998; appears on Down with the Crown)
Brian Hill – bass (1998–1999; appears on Busse Woods)
Guy Pinhas – bass (1999–2005; appears on Free... and III)
Mark Lamb – bass (2007–2017)
Joey Osbourne  – drums (1993–2017)

Timeline

Discography

Studio releases

Compilation appearances 
"Not Fragile" (BTO cover) on In the Groove (1999 The Music Cartel)
"Motorhead" (Hawkwind cover) on Daze of the Underground (2003 Godreah Records)
"The Stake" (Steve Miller Band cover) on Sucking the 70's – Back in the Saddle Again (2006 Small Stone Records)
"Not Fragile" and "Motorhead" included on re-release of Busse Woods.

References

External links 
Official Acid King website

Acid King at Small Stone Records

American stoner rock musical groups
American doom metal musical groups
Heavy metal musical groups from California
Sympathy for the Record Industry artists
Musical groups established in 1993
American musical trios
1993 establishments in California
Occult rock musical groups